George Wright (1847 - 15 May 1913) was an Irish lawyer and judge.

Wright was born in Clonakilty, County Cork, son of Thomas Wright. His father and brothers practised as  solicitors in Clonakilty: one of his brothers was H.T. Wright, Clerk of the Peace for Cork. He married Mary Barrington in 1881. His family owned Fernhill House, Clonakilty, which is now a hotel.

He was called to the Bar in 1871, took silk in 1884, and served as Solicitor-General for Ireland from January 1900 to October 1901 in the Unionist government headed by Lord Salisbury. He was appointed to the Queen's Bench Division of the Irish High Court in 1903 where he served till his death. He was immensely popular with his colleagues and greatly respected as a lawyer. A colleague humorously described him as a man who is "on the borderline of genius but never trespasses"; a popular verse hailed him as "Judge Wright, who's never wrong!"

Wright died  on 15 May 1913.

References 

Solicitors-General for Ireland
1847 births
1913 deaths
People from County Cork
Judges of the High Court of Justice in Ireland